Livonia is the debut album by His Name Is Alive. It was originally released by 4AD on June 25, 1990 in the United Kingdom and in 1992 on 4AD/Rykodisc in the United States.

History
Livonia is the debut LP by Livonia, Michigan's His Name Is Alive (or HNIA). Frontman Warren Defever began recording on a 4-track recorder in his parents' basement while still in high school.  As a result, this album is made up of material originally recorded from 1985 through 1989, rough versions of which appeared in 1988 on a self-released cassette called I Had Sex With God.

In a 2006 interview, Defever recounts that he sent the cassette to 4AD label president Ivo Watts-Russell in 1988, who initially felt that Defever and his band "needed a lot of work."  Ivo also said he wasn't interested in signing any more American bands, due to the difficulty of time zone differences and finding US distribution.  He also suggested that Defever try Rough Trade's US branch.  Defever responded that he had already been rejected by that label, and continued to submit cassettes to 4AD,  with revised and improved versions of the songs appearing on each new tape.

Over time, Ivo and his This Mortal Coil partner John Fryer felt they could actually mix Defever's home recordings into something that 4AD could release, and the album finally appeared in the summer of 1990.  Due to Ivo and Fryer's contribution, along with other superficial similarities, HNIA were often compared to This Mortal Coil during their early years.

The recordings originally consisted of Defever providing the bulk of the music, with Angie Carozzo providing vocals.  Once Defever met Karin Oliver in college, he recruited her to become the band's primary vocalist.  The album still credits Carozzo as a member, although very few of her vocals remain in the finished product (tracks 10 and 11), and she left the band shortly after the album's release.

Track listing
The album was only available in the United States as an import until 1992, when Rykodisc reissued the album on CD, with an instrumental bonus track called "Livonia" appearing at the end of the album. The track was only available on the Rykodisc pressing and was not included on any subsequent 4AD reissues.

Personnel

Musicians
 Warren Defever – guitars, basses, samples
 Karin Oliver – vocals
 Angie Carozzo – vocals
 Damian Lang – percussion on "E-Nicolle", "Fossil" and "reincarnation"
 Jymn Auge – guitar on "Fossil"
 Tracy – bassoon on "You and I Have Seizures"

Production
 Ivo Watts-Russell and John Fryer – mixing (at Blackwing Studios)
 Vaughan Oliver/v23 – art direction and design
 Beverly Carruthers – photography
 Chris Bigg – design assistance

Livonia Strings
In 2006, Defever released through his Silver Mountain Media record label a new version of Livonia, with instrumental strings versions of most of the songs from the original album.  In the interview referenced above, Defever said the strings project was originally conceived as a joke while still signed to 4AD.  He tried to convince the label that he had originally intended the album to be done with strings and he should be given the chance to re-record the album as "originally intended."

4AD actually allowed Defever to move forward with the project, but has refused to release the recordings.  Defever re-recorded the project sometime after leaving the label, although details are scarce.  It was actually first released as disc 5 of the Cloud Box  10-CD box set on Time Stereo in 2004, under the name Mystery Spot.  While Defever gave detailed notes about each CD of this set, his notes on Mystery Spot only said "I don't wanna talk about it, but once you listen you can figure it out, if you're smart."

Defever also said his intentions for releasing the project was to show 4AD that there was still interest in Livonia in America, where the label is not keeping the album (along with the rest of HNIA's 4AD catalog) in print in the United States, despite nothing preventing them from doing so.

The strings CD release was a very limited edition; only 100 copies were made, which sold out very quickly. It is now currently available as a paid MP3 download from the Silver Mountain Media website.

Track listing

References

1990 debut albums
His Name Is Alive albums
4AD albums
Albums produced by John Fryer (producer)
Livonia, Michigan